Vriesea gradata is a species of flowering plant in the Bromeliaceae family. This species is endemic to Brazil.

Cultivars
 Vriesea 'Bobalou'
 Vriesea 'Coppertone'
 Vriesea 'Kelly Anne'
 Vriesea 'Phillip'

References

BSI Cultivar Registry Retrieved 11 October 2009

gradata
Flora of Brazil
Taxa named by John Gilbert Baker
Taxa named by Carl Christian Mez